The 2017–18 Scottish Youth Cup was the 35th season of the Scottish Youth Cup, the national knockout tournament at youth level organised by the Scottish Football Association for its full and associate member clubs. The tournament was for the under-20 age group, to complement current youth development strategies, having formerly been an under-19 competition. Players born after 1 January 1998 were eligible to play.

Calendar

Format
The sixteen clubs who reached the fourth round of the 2016–17 competition received a bye to the third round of this season's tournament. The first two rounds were divided into three regional groups to reduce travelling. The tournament becomes an all-in national competition from the third round onwards.

First round

Central Group
Four ties was drawn in this group with the following clubs receiving a bye to the second round:

Alloa Athletic
Berwick Rangers
BSC Glasgow
Burntisland Shipyard
Cumbernauld Colts
Edinburgh City
Edusport Academy
Hamilton Academical
Heriot Watt University
Livingston
Lothian Thistle Hutchison Vale
Queen's Park
St Mirren
Stirling Albion
Tynecastle
University of Stirling

North Group
Five ties were drawn in this group, with the following clubs receiving byes to the second round.

Clachnacuddin
Forfar Athletic
Fraserburgh
Montrose
Turriff United

South Group
Two ties were drawn in this group, and no clubs received a bye.

Second round

Central Group

North Group

South Group

Third round
The draw for the third round was made on 10 October 2017. The following sixteen clubs entered at this stage, by virtue of having reached the fourth round of last season's competition:

Aberdeen
Ayr United
Celtic
Dundee United
Dunfermline Athletic
Falkirk
Greenock Morton
Heart of Midlothian
Hibernian
Kilmarnock
Motherwell
Partick Thistle
Queen of the South
Rangers
St Johnstone
Spartans

Fourth round
The fourth round draw was announced on 7 November 2017.

Quarter-finals
The quarter-finals draw was announced on 19 December 2017.

Semi-finals
The semi-final ties were played on 5 and 12 April 2018.

Final

External links
Youth Cup on Scottish FA website

References

5
Scottish Youth Cup seasons